Midna Ruda is a selo in Bakhmut Raion, Donetsk Oblast, Ukraine.  It is considered "Bakhmut's coal mine."  During the 2022 Russian Invasion of Ukraine, Midna Ruda was captured by Russian and DPR forces.

History 
Midna Ruda and the nearby town of Klynove was one of the main focuses of Russia during the Donbas Offensive.  It was at the doorstep of Sievierodonetsk and after Russian forces took the city of Svitlodarsk, on 26 May, Russian forces captured Midna Ruda.

References 

Villages in Bakhmut Raion
Donetsk People's Republic